SMIT may refer to:

Institutes
 IT and Development Centre. Ministry of the Interior, Estonia, agency under the Ministry of the Interior responsible for providing the developing ICT services for Estonia 
 Sikkim Manipal Institute of Technology, a co-educational private institute of engineering and management in Majitar, Rangpo, East Sikkim, India
 Saroj Mohan Institute of Technology, a co-educational private engineering college in West Bengal, India

Other uses
 Smit International, a Dutch company operating in the maritime sector
 IBM AIX SMIT, the AIX OS interface

See also
 Smit, a surname